Benguela (Umbundu: Luombaka) is a city in western Angola, capital of Benguela Province. Benguela is one of Angola's most populous cities with a population of 555,124 in the city and 561,775 in the municipality, at the 2014 census.

History

Portuguese rule

Benguela was founded in 1617 as São Felipe de Benguela by the Portuguese under Manuel Cerveira Pereira, 8th Governor of Angola (1604–1607). 
It was long the centre of an important trade, especially in slaves to Brazil and Cuba. However, the nearby deep-water sheltered harbour of Lobito was a much larger port. 

Besides the churches of S. Felipe and S. António, the hospital, and the fortress, as of 1911 there were only a few stone-built houses. A short way beyond Benguela is Baía Farta, where salt was manufactured and sulphur was extracted. Close to Baia Farta was the beach of Baia Azul. The city prospered and grew in the following decades. 

The Benguela Railway was built in the early 20th century by Portugal to connect the city and Lobito to the interior, and it achieved great success when linked to the Copperbelt of Katanga, DR Congo and Zambia.

Starting in the early 20th century, Benguela attracted, developed, and retained quality businesses and professionals into its growing economy. Sisal and fishing industries expanded and the financial, construction and services market boomed until 1974.

Post-independence
In 1975, after the April 1974 Carnation Revolution in Lisbon, Portugal, the Portuguese Overseas Province of Angola became independent. 

In 1983 Benguela had a population of 155,000. During the civil war the city of Benguela increased its population due to refugees from the countryside.

21st century
In the mid-2000s, with a more peaceful environment, restoration of the railway between Benguela and Huambo commenced.

While the colonial part of the city consists of relatively good-quality houses, as of 2011 most of the refugees live in slum areas.

Transports
The city has an airport, the Benguela Airport.
The city is connected to the railway with the Benguela Railway.

Economy

Benguela was one of the centres of Portuguese trade to the African interior. The city remains an important commercial link between western and eastern Angola. Coffee, corn, sisal, sugarcane, and tobacco are grown in the interior regions of Angola and widely traded in Benguela. 

Manganese from the interior is also traded in Benguela. Industries local to the city include fish processing and the milling of sugarcane; the city also produces pottery, soap, and tools.

Lobito, once the busiest port in Angola, was severely disrupted during the Angolan Civil War. The port has since revived and supports trade in the Benguela region.

Education 

The Universidade Katyavala Bwila and Ruvandro Ferreira was founded in 2009.

Culture

Religion 
Among the places of worship, they are predominantly Christian churches and temples : 
Roman Catholic Diocese of Benguela (Catholic Church)
Evangelical Congregational Church in Angola (World Communion of Reformed Churches)
Evangelical Reformed Church in Angola (World Communion of Reformed Churches)
Baptist Convention of Angola (Baptist World Alliance)
Universal Church of the Kingdom of God, Assemblies of God.

Notable residents
Maria Araújo Kahn (born 1963/1964), associate judge on the Connecticut Supreme Court
Leila Lopes - Miss Angola 2010 and Miss Universe 2011
Matias Damásio

References

 
Provincial capitals in Angola
Populated places in Benguela Province
Municipalities of Angola
Populated coastal places in Angola
Populated places established in 1617
1617 establishments in Africa
1610s establishments in Angola
1617 establishments in the Portuguese Empire